Labidochromis freibergi is a species of cichlid endemic to Lake Malawi where it is only known to occur around Likoma Island in areas with rocky substrates.  This species grows to a length of  TL. The specific name of this species honours the American fish importer Jacob Freiberg.

References

Fish of Malawi
freibergi
Fish described in 1974
Taxonomy articles created by Polbot
Fish of Lake Malawi